László Ranódy (14 September 1919 – 14 October 1983) was a Hungarian film director. He directed 18 films between 1950 and 1980. His film Drama of the Lark was entered into the 1964 Cannes Film Festival.

Selected filmography
 Drama of the Lark (1963)
 Árvácska (1976)

References

External links

1919 births
1983 deaths
People from Sombor
Hungarians in Vojvodina
Hungarian film directors